Offbeat, originally a music term meaning "not following the standard beat", which has also become a general synonym for "unconventional" or "unusual", may refer to:

Music
Syncopation
Off-beat (music), the musical term in more detail
Off Beat (label), a German record label for electronic underground music
OffBeat (music magazine), a music magazine based in New Orleans, Louisiana
Offbeat: A Red Hot Soundtrip, a compilation album from the Red Hot AIDS Benefit Series
Offbeats (band), a San Antonio-based garage punk band
Offbeat Recording Studio & Music Productions, based in Edinburgh, Scotland

Film and TV
Off Beat (1986 film), a 1986 comedy film
Off Beat (2004 film), a 2004 drama film
Offbeat (film), a 1961 film

Others
Offbeat generation, association of writers united by their opposition to mainstream publishing
Off Beat (comics), a 2005 manga-influenced comic series by Jennifer Lee Quick

See also
Alternative rock
Backbeat (disambiguation)